Klara Bornett (born 1899 - death unknown) was an Austrian diver who competed in the 1924 Summer Olympics and the 1928 Summer Olympics.

Little is known about Bornett's early days but she would have been in her twenties when she represented Austria in the 1924 Summer Olympics in Paris, she competed in the 3 metre springboard event, in her first round group she scored 417.4 points and finished third and qualified for the final, in the final there were six divers and unfortunately one judge marked her in fourth place while the other four judges had her marked in sixth which was her overall finish position.

In between her Olympic appearances, Bornett won the gold medal in the 3 metre springboard at the 1927 European Aquatics Championships held in Bologna, Italy.

For the 1928 Summer Olympics in Amsterdam, there was just 10 entries for the 3 metre springboard so it was a straight final where Bornett finished in 9th place.

Her career came to an end when she became blind in one eye, and some years later she lost her eyesight completely.

References

1899 births
Austrian female divers
Olympic divers of Austria
Divers at the 1924 Summer Olympics
Divers at the 1928 Summer Olympics
Year of death missing